Włosień may refer to the following places in Poland:
Włosień, Lower Silesian Voivodeship (south-west Poland)
Włosień, Lesser Poland Voivodeship (south Poland)